Camilla Martens (born 23 October 1989) is a Danish female badminton player.

Achievements

BWF International Challenge/Series
Women's Doubles

 BWF International Challenge tournament
 BWF International Series tournament
 BWF Future Series tournament

References

External links
 

1989 births
Living people
Danish female badminton players
21st-century Danish women